BIGFlix is a Reliance Entertainment owned movie on demand service in 2008.  It is India’s first movie on demand service.  It allows users to stream or download movies at any time. 

BIGFlix terms itself as a user’s 'Personal Blockbuster Theatre'.

The portal offers a wide array of films, movie trailers, and reviews, on and about Indian entertainment. Movies are available in different genres like action, comedy, drama, romance etc., and cater to several Indian languages like Hindi, Telugu, Tamil, and Bengali.

The movies are streamed without any advertisements in between, and are of high definition, with an option to unsubscribe at any time.

See also
Online Video Rental
Reliance Industries
Indian Cinema

References

External links
BIGFlix.com

Companies based in Mumbai
Video rental services
Reliance Group
Indian companies established in 2008
2008 establishments in Maharashtra